Alstroemeria patagonica is a species of flowering plant in the family Alstroemeriaceae, native to southern Argentina and southern Chile.

References

patagonica
Flora of South Argentina
Flora of southern Chile
Plants described in 1896